Niklas Zulciak (born 3 February 1994) is a German professional footballer who plays as an attacking midfielder.

Career
Zulciak joined Stal Mielec in 2017.

Career statistics

Honours
Lech Poznań
 Ekstraklasa: 2014–15
 Polish SuperCup: 2015

External links

References

1994 births
Living people
German footballers
Association football midfielders
Ekstraklasa players
I liga players
II liga players
III liga players
3. Liga players
Lech Poznań II players
Lech Poznań players
FSV Frankfurt players
SV Viktoria Preußen 07 players
Wisła Puławy players
Warta Poznań players
Würzburger Kickers players
German expatriate footballers
German expatriate sportspeople in Poland
Expatriate footballers in Poland
Footballers from Frankfurt